The following is a list of bases of the Namibian Air Force.

Current Bases

See also
Namibian Air Force

References

Namibia
Military of Namibia
Namibia-related lists